A History of the World, (Hungarian: A világ történelme) edited by  and illustrated by Richard Geiger, is a six-volume history of the world in Hungarian published between 1906 and 1908.

Background 
Written for the general public, the books are Art Nouveau style, large-format, gilded, and bound. Illustrated with  hundreds of black-and-white and color images, printed on polished paper by Richard Geiger, and was published by Műintézet és Kiadóvállalat R.-T. in Budapest. The six volumes range from the Ancient East to the present (i.e. the beginning of the 20th century). They cover the period of ancient Greeks, the Roman Empire, the Middle Ages and the modern age. In each volume, the editor used works by Victor Duruy, Fekten Károly, H. Grimme, Heyck Ödön, Huber Alfonz, and Alfred Nicolas Rambaud.

The series is divided into six volumes, but some parts extend into other volumes, and some parts start in the middle of a volume. This makes it difficult to use the work. There is no reprint of this work.

Volumes

A világ történelme

Gallery 
The volumes featured hundreds of illustrations by Richard Geiger in the Art Nouveau style.

See also 
 Human history

References

Bibliography

External links

1906 books
Hungarian books
20th-century history books